Burton-in-Kendal is a civil parish in the South Lakeland District of Cumbria, England. It contains 32 listed buildings that are recorded in the National Heritage List for England. Of these, one is listed at Grade I, the highest of the three grades, one is at Grade II*, the middle grade, and the others are at Grade II, the lowest grade.  The parish contains the village of Burton-in-Kendal and the surrounding countryside.  The Lancaster Canal passes through the parish, and the listed buildings associated with this are a bridge, an aqueduct, and a milestone.  The other listed buildings are located in the village, apart from two boundary stones, a milestone, and a farmhouse.  In the village, the listed buildings include houses  and associated structures, a church and items in the churchyard, hotels, public houses, a market cross, and a commemorative lamp post.


Key

Buildings

References

Citations

Sources

Lists of listed buildings in Cumbria